Amaterasu is the goddess of the sun in Japanese mythology.

Amaterasu may also refer to:

Astronomy 
 10385 Amaterasu, a main belt asteroid
 Amaterasu Patera, a crater on Io

Fiction 
 Amaterasu (manga), a manga series by Suzue Miuchi
 Amaterasu (Ōkami), the protagonist of the video game Ōkami
 Amaterasu (Stargate), a character in the television series Stargate SG-1
 Amaterasu, the central figure of the manga series The Five Star Stories
 Amaterasu, a ship in the anime series Starship Operators
 Amaterasu Miko, a character in the manga series O-Parts Hunter
 A solar probe in Andy Weir's Project Hail Mary